Muhammad Izhar ul Haq (born 14 February 1948) is a poet of Urdu language, a columnist and analyst from Pakistan. He has received national and international recognition for his contribution to Urdu literature and journalism, and has been awarded various literary and national awards, including Pakistan's highest civil award Pride of performance in 2008, for his services in the field of literature and poetry.  He has published five books of Urdu poetry and writes column in Daily 92 News, under the title "Talkh Nawai (تلخ نوائ)".

Poetry
Muhammad Izhar ul Haq has published five books of Urdu poetry:

 Diwaar-e-aab (winner of Adamjee Literary Award 1982)
 Ghadr (1986)
 Paree-zaad (1995)
 Paani peh Bichha Takht (winner of Allama Iqbal Award 2003)
 Kai Mausam Guzar Gaye Mujh Par (collection of earlier four books) (2012)

English translation of Izhar ul Haq's poetry can be read in the anthology "Pakistani Urdu Verse, Oxford University Press 2010", translated and edited by Yasmeen Hameed.

Critique
Intizar Hussain commented that "Izharul Haq is equally well-versed in the ghazal as well as in free verse. In both forms, he has been able to devise a diction, which distinguishes his verse from those of his contemporaries."

Columns and other literary works
He has been a columnist in Jang, Daily Jinnah, Nawaiwaqt, Daily Dunya, and presently in Daily 92 News. The title of his Urdu column is "Talkh Nawai", which translates to "bitter discourse". Veteran Urdu columnist Rauf Klasra in his preface to "Talkh Nawai" notes that Izhar ul Haq's command and mastery over classical literature is equally impressive whether it is Urdu, English, or Persian, and he has the ability to effectively use his literary prowess in his columns. 

Izhar ul Haq has also contributed in the research for implementation of Urdu in Pakistan, with the National Language Authority, and also contributed as one of the compilers of the Qaumi English-Urdu Dictionary, published by the National Language Authority. In addition, he contributed with Pakistan Academy of Letters in compiling yearly selection of Pakistani literature.

For his services to Urdu literature and poetry, Muhammad Izhar ul Haq was awarded Pride of Performance by the government of Pakistan in 2008. The Capital Development Authority of Islamabad titled its library "Gosha-e-Izhar" in 2017 after Muhammad Izhar ul Haq's literary contribution.

See also
Zafar Iqbal
Jon Elia
Anwar Masood
Yasmeen Hameed

References

External links 
 Official Website of Muhammad Izhar ul Haq
 Online collection of Izhar ul Haq's poetry at Urdu Point
 Online collection of Izhar ul Haq's poetry at Rekhta.org
 Literary Interview with Izhar ul Haq
 Interview in DAWN
 Review of Kayi Mausam Guzar Gaye Mujh Par by Zafar Iqbal
 Review by Mushir Anwar
 Izhar ul Haq at Urdu Society of Australia
 Poets discuss contemporary Pakistani poetry and society
 One day symposium on “The Role of Writers in National Security”
 English translation of selected poems of Izhar by Muhammad Salim ur Rehman
 Muhammad Izhar ul Haq in Sydney Mushaira

Pakistani poets
Urdu-language poets from Pakistan
Pakistani male journalists
Living people
1948 births
People from Attock District
Recipients of the Pride of Performance
Urdu-language columnists
21st-century Urdu-language writers
Recipients of the Adamjee Literary Award
Pakistani civil servants
University of the Punjab alumni
University of Dhaka alumni